The Journal Inquirer is a daily newspaper published on Monday to Friday afternoons and Saturday mornings from Manchester, Connecticut. The Journal Inquirer serves 17 towns in the north-central part of the state of Connecticut.

History 
In 1967, Neil Ellis, a real estate developer with an interest in journalism, bought two weekly newspapers, the Rockville Journal and South and East Windsor Inquirer. The weeklies were merged into the daily Journal Inquirer in 1968. 

The paper moved from a garage in the Rockville section of Vernon to its present location in Manchester in 1974. The Rockville Journal dates back over 105 years.

Elizabeth S. Ellis, the founder's partner, oversaw paper's expansion during her tenure as publisher from 1970 until her death in 2020. As a female-in-charge, she was a rarity in journalism.

Area Served 
The regional paper prints in three editions:
1st edition: Enfield, Somers, Suffield, East Windsor, Windsor and Windsor Locks.
2nd edition: Manchester, East Hartford, Bolton, Andover, Coventry  and Hebron.
3rd edition: Vernon, Ellington, Tolland, South Windsor, and Stafford.

Fringe towns with some circulation but limited coverage include Willington, Union, Glastonbury and the city of Hartford.

The Journal Inquirer uses the "Oxford" or serial comma, unlike most American newspapers that follow the AP Stylebook.

Extra Information 
The Journal Inquirer has both print and electronic subscriptions, with delivery service for the former. It is commonly sold in stores around the towns it serves, such as Big Y, Geissler's, etc.

See also
Manchester, Connecticut

References

Newspapers published in Connecticut
Economy of Manchester, Connecticut
Companies based in Hartford County, Connecticut
Companies based in Manchester, Connecticut
Mass media in Hartford County, Connecticut